The 56th Guards Air Assault Regiment is an airborne regiment of the Russian Airborne Troops. Based at Feodosia in Crimea, the regiment is part of the 7th Guards Mountain Air Assault Division. It was formed in 2021 from the 56th Guards Airborne Brigade, based at Kamyshin. The brigade was first formed in 1979 and fought in the Soviet–Afghan War, the First Chechen War and the Second Chechen War.

History 
The 56th Separate Guards Air Assault Brigade was formed on 1 October 1979 in Chirchiq from the disbanded 105th Guards Airborne Division's 351st Guards Airborne Regiment. The new brigade inherited battle honors from that unit. On 13 December, the brigade was transferred to Termez in preparation for deployment to Afghanistan. On 27 December, the brigade's 4th Airborne Battalion crossed the Afghan border and secured Salang Pass. The 3rd Air Assault battalion was airlifted by helicopter into Afghanistan and captured Rabat-Mirza-Kushka Pass on the next day. Between 13 and 14 January 1980, the brigade crossed the border and concentrated at Kunduz. At the same time, the 3rd Air Assault Battalion moved to Kandahar. In February, the 4th Airborne Battalion was transferred to Charikar but was moved back to Kunduz in the same year. The 2nd Air Assault Battalion was attached to the 70th Separate Guards Motor Rifle Brigade in March. In December 1981, the brigade was moved to Gardez. The brigade was reequipped with the BMP-2 infantry fighting vehicle in 1985. On 5 April, it was awarded the Order of the Patriotic War 1st class. It fought in Operation Magistral from December 1987 to January 1988. In June 1988, the brigade crossed the border back into Turkmenistan during the Soviet withdrawal from Afghanistan. After its return from Afghanistan, the brigade was based in Ýolöten. 

The brigade became the 56th Guards Airborne Brigade in 1989. In January and February 1990, the brigade was deployed to Baku to patrol the border as a result of the Baku pogrom. On 1 June, the brigade was transferred to the Soviet airborne and renamed the 40th Separate Airborne Brigade. The newly renamed brigade was transferred to Fergana a week later to conduct security operations. After the Dissolution of the Soviet Union, the brigade was moved to the North Caucasus in Karachay-Cherkessia. The brigade was given the designation Don Cossack on 22 April 1994. Between December 1994 and October 1996, the brigade fought in the First Chechen War. In 1997, it was renamed the 56th Guards Airborne Regiment. In August 1999, a battalion sized task force of the regiment was deployed to fight in the Second Chechen War. After being withdrawn from Chechnya in November 2004, the regiment once again became the 56th Guards Airborne Brigade on 1 May 2009 and in July 2010 was designated as the 56th Guards Airborne Brigade (Light). In 2013, it became part of the Russian Airborne Troops.

In January 2016, VDV commander General Colonel Vladimir Shamanov announced that a new range near Kamyshin would be built in the spring of that year due to the higher intensity of combat training. 

In 2021 it was indicated that the brigade would be redeployed to Crimea and reformed as a regiment. In mid-2021 it relocated from Kamyshin in Volgograd Oblast, Russia to Feodosia in Crimea. These circumstances explain a lot of the poor facilities, chaos, and undermanning described in Pavel Filatyev's memoir text. In November, 2021 it was confirmed that the new regiment would become a component of the 7th Guards Mountain Air Assault Division effective as of December 2021.

According to Pavel Filatyev's memoir 2022 the reformed regiment attacked from Crimea to Kherson as part of Southern Ukraine campaign of 2022 Russian invasion of Ukraine and took part in Battle of Kherson.

Component Units 2021 

 Airborne battalion 
 2nd Air assault battalion
 3rd Air assault battalion
 Tank battalion 
 Reconnaissance battalion 
 Artillery battalion 
 Anti-aircraft battery
 Anti-tank battery
 Rifle (sniper) company 
 Electronic warfare company
 Signals company 
 Engineer company 
 Landing support company 
 Medical company 
 Maintenance company 
 Material support company 
 RCB company 
 Brigade command company

Commanders 
 Alexander Petrovich Plokhikh (1980–1981)
 Mikhail Karpushkin (1981–1982)
 Viktor Arsentevich Sukhin (1982–1983)
 Viktor Matveevich Chizhikov (1983–1985)
 Vitaly Raevsky (1985–1987)
 Valery Evnevich (1987–1990)
 Alexander Sotnik (1990–1995)
 Sergei Mishanin (1995–1996)
 Rustam Aliev Stepanenko (1996–1997)
 Pavel Kirsi
 Igor Timofeyev
 Alexander Vitalievich Lebedev (2012–2014)
 Alexander Valitov (August 2014–March 2018)
 Colonel Yevgeny Nikolayevich Tonkikh (March 2018–March 2020)
 Colonel Andrey Vladimirovich Kondrashkin (March 2020–present)

References 

Regiments of the Russian Airborne Troops
Military units and formations of the 2022 Russian invasion of Ukraine